One Call Away can refer to:

 "One Call Away" (Chingy song), 2003
 "One Call Away" (Charlie Puth song), 2015